The 1967 NPSL Final was the National Professional Soccer League's postseason championship final of the 1967 season.  The event was contested in a two-game aggregate match between the Oakland Clippers and the Baltimore Bays.  The first leg was played on September 3, 1967 at Memorial Stadium in Baltimore, Maryland, with the Bays winning 1–0. The return leg was contested on September 9, 1967 at the Oakland-Alameda Coliseum in Oakland, California, and the Clippers won it by the score of 4–1. With the two-day competition complete, the Oakland Clippers held a 4–2 aggregate lead and were crowned the 1967 NPSL champions.

Background
The Baltimore Bays finished first in the Eastern Division regular season with 162 points. The Oakland Clippers finished first in the Western Division regular season with 185 points. This earned each team the right to compete in the championship series.

Match summary

Match details

First leg

Second leg

1967 NPSL Champions: Oakland Clippers

References 

1967b
1
1967b
September 1967 sports events in the United States
1967 in sports in Maryland
1967 in sports in California
Sports competitions in Oakland, California
Sports competitions in Baltimore
Soccer in California
Soccer in Maryland